The 2019 Men's European Volleyball Championship was the 31st edition of the Men's European Volleyball Championship, organised by Europe's governing volleyball body, the CEV. For the first time the EuroVolley was held in four countries: France, Slovenia, Belgium and Netherlands. The tournament ran from 12 to 29 September 2019. The number of national teams participating in the event was also expanded from 16 to 24.

Serbia won the title over finalist Slovenia in the final held in Paris.

Qualification

Pools composition
Montenegro and North Macedonia made their first appearance, whilst Russia was the defending champions. The drawing of lots is combined with a seeding of National Federations and performed as follows:
 The 4 Organisers are seeded in Preliminary pools. France in Pool A, Belgium in Pool B, Slovenia in Pool C and Netherlands in Pool D.
 The first and second best ranked from the previous edition of the CEV competition are drawn in different Preliminary pools,
 According to the CEV National Team ranking list as per 4 September 2017, National Federations are seeded by descending order in a number of cups that equals the number of Preliminary pools.

Draw
The drawing of lots was held on 16 January 2019 at the Atomium, Brussels, Belgium.

Squads

Venues

Pool standing procedure
 Number of matches won
 Match points
 Sets ratio
 Points ratio
 If the tie continues as per the point ratio between two teams, the priority will be given to the team which won the match between them. When the tie in points ratio is between three or more teams, a new classification of these teams in the terms of points 1, 2, 3 and 4 will be made taking into consideration only the matches in which they were opposed to each other.

Match won 3–0 or 3–1: 3 match points for the winner, 0 match points for the loser
Match won 3–2: 2 match points for the winner, 1 match point for the loser

Preliminary round
All times are Central European Summer Time (UTC+02:00).
The top four teams in each pool qualified for the final round.

Pool A

|}

|}

Pool B

|}

|}

Pool C

|}

|}

Pool D

|}

|}

Final round
All times are Central European Summer Time (UTC+02:00).

Round of 16
|}

Quarterfinals
|}

Semifinals
|}

3rd place match
|}

Final
|}

Final standing

Awards

Most Valuable Player
 Uroš Kovačević
Best Setter 
 Benjamin Toniutti
Best Outside Spikers
 Wilfredo León
 Uroš Kovačević

Best Middle Blockers
 Jan Kozamernik
 Srećko Lisinac
Best Opposite Spiker
 Aleksandar Atanasijević
Best Libero
 Jani Kovačič

See also
2019 Women's European Volleyball Championship

References

External links
Official website
CEV website

2019
European Volleyball
European Volleyball
European Volleyball
European Volleyball
European Volleyball
European Volleyball, 2019, Men
European Volleyball, 2019, Men
European Volleyball, 2019, Men
European Volleyball, 2019, Men
2019 in European sport
September 2019 sports events in Europe